Pollham is a municipality in the district of Grieskirchen in the Austrian state of Upper Austria.

Geography
Pollham lies on the upper Polsenz. About 16 percent of the municipality is forest, and 71 percent is farmland.

References

Cities and towns in Grieskirchen District